The blue-lipped sea krait (Laticauda laticaudata), also known as the blue-banded sea krait or common sea krait, is a species of venomous sea snake in the subfamily Laticaudinae of the family Elapidae. It is found in the Indian and Western Pacific Oceans.

Taxonomy 
The blue-lipped sea krait was one of the many species originally described by Carl Linnaeus in his landmark 1758 10th edition of Systema Naturae, where it was given the binomial name Coluber laticaudatus. There are two subspecies, Laticauda laticaudata laticaudata and Laticauda laticaudata affinis.

Description

Ventral scales of this snake are large, one-third to more than one-half the width of the body; the nostrils are lateral; nasal scales are separated by internasals; 19 longitudinal rows of imbricate scales are found at midbody; no azygous prefrontal shield is present; rostral scales are undivided; ventrals number 225–243; subcaudals number 38–47 in males, females have 30–35 (ventral and subcaudal counts after Smith 1943:443). The upper lip is dark brown. The 19 rows of scales and the dark brown upper lip can be used to differentiate the blue-lipped sea krait from other Laticauda species.

Distribution and habitat
This species is found in the Indian and Western Pacific Oceans: Bay of Bengal (Bangladesh, East India, Andaman & Nicobar Islands, Sri Lanka, Myanmar, Thailand), coasts of Malay Peninsula to Indonesia, Timor-Leste, New Guinea, the Philippines, off the coasts of Fujian and Taiwan, Japan, Polynesia, Melanesia, Solomon Islands, New Caledonia, Palau, Vanuatu, Fiji, and Australia (Queensland).  One specimen was found in Devonport, New Zealand in 2011, however it died shortly after being taken to Kelly Tarlton's Sea Life Aquarium.
The blue-lipped sea snake is spread all over the west pacific, making it known as the common sea krait, however taxonomic studies might indicate they might be an endemic species.

Special features
This snake is known to warm up in wedge-tailed shearwater burrows.

References
 Kharin V. E. 1984 Revision of sea snakes of subfamily Laticaudinae Cope, 1879 sensu lato (Serpentes, Hydrophiidae). Trudy Zoologicheskogo Instituta 124: 128-139

External links

 .
 

Laticauda
Reptiles of the Indian Ocean
Fauna of the Pacific Ocean
Snakes of Asia
Snakes of Australia
Reptiles of Bangladesh
Reptiles of Cambodia
Snakes of China
Reptiles of India
Reptiles of Indonesia
Reptiles of Japan
Reptiles of Malaysia
Reptiles of Myanmar
Reptiles of Papua New Guinea
Reptiles of the Philippines
Reptiles of Sri Lanka
Reptiles of Taiwan
Reptiles of Thailand
Snakes of Vietnam
Reptiles described in 1758
Taxa named by Carl Linnaeus
Snakes of New Guinea